Glebe House and Glebe Gallery are located just outside the town of Letterkenny near Churchill. The English portrait and landscape painter Derek Hill lived and worked there from 1954 until he presented the house and his art collection to the Irish state in 1981. Hill's former studio has been converted into a modern gallery with changing exhibitions while his art collection is shown in his former home together with European and oriental furniture and William Morris wallpapers and fabrics. The collection includes works by Pablo Picasso, Georges Braque, Louis le Brocquy, Graham Sutherland, Auguste Renoir, Jack Butler Yeats, Oskar Kokoshka, Patrick Swift and the native Tory Island painter, James Dixon.

Run by the Office of Public Works the gallery is open for a limited season each year - around Easter and then from June to the end of September. Access to the permanent collection in Glebe House is by guided tour only. The woodland gardens, which border Lough Gartan, are open all year round.

Buildings and structures in County Donegal
Art museums and galleries in the Republic of Ireland
Tourist attractions in County Donegal